Amenhotep called Huy was Viceroy of Kush under Tutankhamen. He was the successor of Tuthmosis, who served under Akhenaten. He would later be succeeded by Paser I.

Huy was the son of a lady named Werner. His father is not known. Huy was married to Taemwadjsy, chief of the harem of Amun and of the Harem of Nebkheperure (Tutankhamun). They had a son named Paser.

Titles of Huy: Scribe of the letters of the viceroy, Merymose. King's scribe, Mery-netjer priest, King's messenger to every land.

People associated with Huy:
 Harnufer, "Scribe of the gold-accounts of the king's son"
 Kna, "Scribe of the king's son"

Burial
Amenhotep Huy was buried in TT40 located in Qurnet Murai. In the tomb there is reference to a Temple named "Satisfying the Gods" in Nubia. Huy is shown being greeted there by Khay, High Priest of Nebkheperure (Tutankhamen), Penne, Deputy of the fortress of Nebkheperure (Tutankhamen), Huy, the Mayor, and  Mermose, (his brother) the second prophet of Nebkheperure. Taemwadjsy was Chief of the Harem of Nebkheperure (Chief of the female attendants of the temple) at this temple.

References

External links
 Tomb of Huy on Osirisnet

Officials of the Eighteenth Dynasty of Egypt
Huy
Ancient Egyptian priests